Shay Phillip Spitz (born 27 January 1988) is a former Hong Kong-born New Zealand professional footballer who played as a midfielder.

Spitz holds United States citizenship as well, but grew up in Singapore, Portugal and Australia. Despite holding New Zealand and American citizenship, Spitz did not spend time growing up in either country.

Career

College and amateur
Spitz took classes at Orange Coast College in Orange County, California for one semester, but did not play intercollegiate soccer.  In 2006, Spitz transferred to California State University, Fullerton and played college soccer for four years, making 77 appearances and scoring 12 goals.

Spitz also spent the 2010 season with Hollywood United Hitmen in the USL Premier Development League.

Professional
On 15 February 2012, Spitz signed a professional contract with USL Pro club Los Angeles Blues and made his debut on 4 May in a 2-1 win over the Wilmington Hammerheads.

Kitchee
On 12 September 2012, Spitz signed a professional contract with Hong Kong First Division club Kitchee. He was forced to leave the club after reports that he did not have a work permit which was required even though he was born in Hong Kong.

Los Angeles Blues
In March 2013, Spitz rejoined Los Angeles Blues. He scored his first goal for the club on 26 April 2013 in a 4-0 victory over the Wilmington Hammerheads.

Southern District
On 9 July 2015, Spitz joined Southern after a season with Hong Kong Rangers.

On 2 July 2017, Southern announced on Facebook that Spitz would return for the upcoming season.

On 29 June 2020, it was announced that Spitz would leave the club and return to Australia to develop his career.

International career
Spitz was included in the 12-player roster of United States national beach soccer team for Copa Salvador del Mundo 2013.

Family
Shay Spitz's younger brother Tyler Spitz plays for the Hong Kong national rugby union team.

References

1. https://www.offside.hk/league/shay-spitz-i-was-a-third-culture-child-and-football-helped-me/

External links

Cal State Fullerton bio

1988 births
Living people
New Zealand association footballers
American soccer players
Cal State Fullerton Titans men's soccer players
Hollywood United Hitmen players
Orange County SC players
Richmond Kickers players
Expatriate soccer players in the United States
USL League Two players
USL Championship players
Hong Kong First Division League players
Hong Kong Premier League players
Kitchee SC players
Hong Kong Rangers FC players
Southern District FC players
American people of New Zealand descent
New Zealand people of American descent
American sportspeople of Hong Kong descent
New Zealand people of Hong Kong descent
Hong Kong people of New Zealand descent
Hong Kong people of American descent
Association football midfielders
American beach soccer players